Lake Consequence is a 1992 made for television erotic drama film. It was directed by Rafael Eisenman with casting by Sue Swan. The film's tagline was, "A man and two women".

Plot
Irene (Joan Severance), a housewife becomes bored while her husband and son are absent on a weekend fishing trip. She becomes attracted to Billy (Billy Zane), a man she met when he trimmed a tree in her neighborhood.  She accidentally becomes trapped in his trailer and arrives at Lake Consequence hours later.  Discovered by his bisexual girlfriend, Grace (May Karasun), and then Billy, they agree to drive her into town so she can catch a bus home. Chinese New Year is in full swing and she is seduced by Billy during the celebrations at a Chinese nightclub and bath house.

As Irene develops an erotic relationship with Billy, repressed images of her teenage experience return. Confronted by her own sexuality and her forgotten past, and jealous of Billy's attentions to Grace, Irene flees after starting a fire.

However Billy chases her and drives her home, where her husband and child have yet to return.  Feeling grief and self-loathing, Irene hesitates to return to her family. Billy lectures her on her responsibilities as wife, helps her to dress and disappears before they return that night.

Cast
Billy Zane  as Billy 
Joan Severance  as Irene 
 May Karasun as Grace
Whip Hubley as Jim 
Courtland Mead as Christopher

External links

Movie review on Time Out London

1990s erotic drama films
1992 television films
1992 films
Adultery in films
American erotic drama films
American drama television films
Films about dysfunctional families
Films scored by George S. Clinton
1990s American films
1990s English-language films